The Digital Access to a Sky Century @ Harvard (DASCH) is a project to preserve and digitize images recorded on astronomical photographic plates created before astronomy became dominated by digital imaging.  It is a major project of the Center for Astrophysics  Harvard & Smithsonian.  Over 500,000 glass plates held by the Harvard College Observatory are to be digitized.  The digital images will contribute to time domain astronomy, providing over a hundred years of data that may be compared to current observations.

From 1885 until 1992, the Harvard College Observatory repeatedly photographed the night sky using observatories in both the northern and southern hemispheres.  Over half a million glass photographic plates are stored in the observatory archives providing a unique resource to astronomers.  The Harvard collection is over three times the size of the next largest collection of astronomical photographic plates and is almost a quarter of all known photographic images of the sky on glass plates.  Those plates were seldom used after digital imaging became the standard near the end of the twentieth century.  The scope of the Harvard plate collection is unique in that it covers the entire sky for a very long period of time.

Goals
The project web site states that the goals of DASCH are to 
enable new Time Domain Astronomy (TDA) science, including:
 Conduct the first long-term temporal variability survey on days to decades time scales
 Novae and dwarf novae distributions and populations in the Galaxy
 Black hole and neutron star X-ray binaries in outburst: constraining the BH, NS binary populations in the Galaxy 
 Black hole masses of bright quasars from long-term variability measures to constrain their characteristic shortest timescales and thus size 
 Quiescent black holes in galactic nuclei revealed by tidal disruption of a passing field star and resultant optical flare 
 Unexpected classes of variables or temporal behavior of known objects: preview of what PanSTARSS and LSST may see in much more detail but on shorter timescales.

History
Digitizing the Harvard College Observatory's astronomical plates archive was first considered in the 1980s by Jonathan E. Grindlay, a professor of astronomy at Harvard.  Grindlay encouraged Alison Doane, then curator of the archive, to explore digitizing the collection with a commercial image scanner.  Working with Jessica Mink, an archivist of the Center for Astrophysics  Harvard & Smithsonian, Grindlay and Doane determined that a commercial scanner could produce suitable digital images but also found that such machines were too slow.  Working full-time, it would have taken over 50 years to digitize the plates in the Harvard archive with commercial scanners.

Doane presented a talk about the problem at a meeting of the Amateur Telescope Makers of Boston whose clubhouse is located on the grounds of MIT's Haystack Observatory.  Bob Simcoe, a club member and retired engineer, volunteered to help design a machine suitable for the task.  The machine needed to position and record the stellar images on the plates to within half a micron and account for different emulsions, plate thicknesses and densities, exposure times, processing methods and so on.  Software was developed by Mink, Edward Los, another volunteer from the club, and Silas Laycock, a researcher.  Thanks to a grant from the National Science Foundation and donations of time and material, creation of the scanner began in 2004.  The scanner was completed and tested in 2006.  Over 500 plates were imaged before the project ran out of money in July 2007.

For the digital images to be useful for research, the associated metadata also needs to be digitalized.  That data describes what part of the sky and what objects were recorded on each plate along with date, time, telescope, and other pertinent information.  The metadata is recorded in about 1,200 logbooks and on the card catalog of the collection.  In addition, each plate is stored in a paper jacket that includes related information and often scientifically and historically important notes left by previous researchers, including notable astronomers such as Henrietta Swan Leavitt and Annie Jump Cannon.  George Champine, another volunteer from the Amateur Telescope Makers of Boston, photographed the logbooks.  The paper jacket for each plate is photographed as each plate is cleaned and imaged.

Progress

Plate imaging
The first plate images were created by Harvard Observatory staff members in the winter of 2001–2002 using commercial scanners.  A larger test that included imaging 100 plates was conducted in the summer of 2002.  Those tests indicated that commercially available scanners were too slow for digitizing the Harvard plate collection and motivated the development of a custom-built scanner.  The test images are available on-line.  The custom-built high-speed scanner was completed and tested in 2006.

Improvement of the scanner and associated software continues.  A failure of a single part in the plate loader led to a breakdown of the scanner in August 2014.  A new plate loader control system was designed and built by Bob Simcoe allowing scanning to resume in November 2014.

, over 80,000 plates have been scanned and the data released on the DASCH web site, approximately 6.5 percent of the plate collection.  The 80,000th plate was scanned on November 13, 2014.

Metadata transcription
Most of the metadata for the plate collection is contained in 663 bound volumes and about 500 looseleaf logbooks.  Photographs of all of the logbook pages are available on the DASCH website.  The effort to digitize this information began at Harvard.  Some was done in India.  The effort later moved to the American Museum of Natural History where volunteers worked under the supervision of Dr Michael Shara, Curator of the Department of Astrophysics and Holly Klug, Department. of Volunteer Services.

In August 2014, the transcription of the Harvard plate logbooks was taken over by the Smithsonian Transcription Center, a new program to recruit volunteers to transcribe historical documents.  This citizen science project is ongoing with a goal of completing all of the transcription before 2017.

Other activities

Special projects
The DASCH will not generally accept special requests for scanning a particular part of the sky from the collection so that the digitization progresses efficiently.  The DASCH team did accommodate two special requests to image plates that were not part of the Harvard collection "for scientifically compelling reasons".

The New Horizons team requested images of Pluto in order to improve the dwarf planet's ephemeris that was needed to plan precise adjustments to the spacecraft's trajectory.  DASCH scanned 843 plates showing Pluto that were taken by the 40 inch telescope at Lowell Observatory from 1930 to 1951.

Forty-two plates of the Cassiopeia A supernova remnant taken by the Hale telescope at the Palomar Observatory from 1951 to 1989 were imaged to support a study comparing x-ray and visual emissions.  , the study has not been published in a peer reviewed journal.

See also

References

External links
DASCH Home Page
DASCH Logbook Transcription website

2001 establishments in Massachusetts
Astronomy projects
Harvard University
National Science Foundation
Organizations established in 2001
Smithsonian Institution research programs